Max Narváez (born 15 June 1957) is a Paraguayan judoka. He competed in the men's half-lightweight event at the 1984 Summer Olympics.

References

1957 births
Living people
Paraguayan male judoka
Olympic judoka of Paraguay
Judoka at the 1984 Summer Olympics
Place of birth missing (living people)